Steven Ray Hall (born July 6, 1959 in West Palm Beach, Florida) is the Chair of the Faculty and Professor of Aeronautics and Astronautics at the Massachusetts Institute of Technology, in Cambridge, Massachusetts.

His research interests are in aerospace controls systems, including flexible space structure control, control of noise and vibration, especially in helicopters, and the development of smart material actuators. He is the coauthor of seven patents, mostly in the area of smart material actuation. His teaching includes graduate and undergraduate subjects in signals and systems, control theory, guidance and navigation, and flight mechanics and control.

Hall was the lead instructor for the Unified Engineering course freely available through MIT OpenCourseWare.

Personal life 

He grew up in Florida, living in a half dozen towns throughout the central part of the state before graduating from high school in St. Petersburg, Florida. Living in Florida at the height of the space race, he developed an interest in aircraft and rockets early in life.

Since 2008, he is the Associate Housemaster of Simmons Hall, where he runs the Simmons Hall Residential Scholar program. He greatly enjoys living with the Simmons Hall community of students and scholars, which he describes as “warm, welcoming, and vibrant.” His daughter Caitlin lives with him at Simmons Hall and is a graduate student at Emerson College. His son Michael lives in nearby Watertown, Massachusetts. He is a certificated pilot, and proud owner of a Cessna Cutlass RG, which he flies on weekends and vacations.

University positions 

 Chair of the Faculty, 2013–present
 Associate Professor, 1991 – present
 Assistant Department Head, 1997-1998
 Assistant Professor, 1985-1991

Honors and awards 

 MacVicar Faculty Fellow, 2002
 Raymond L. Bisplinghoff Fellow, 1998
 Hertz Fellow, 1983-1985
 Member, Tau Beta Pi

Society memberships 

 Associate Fellow, American Institute of Aeronautics and Astronautics
 Member, Institute of Electrical and Electronics Engineers
 Member, American Helicopter Society
 Member, American Society for Engineering Education

References 

Living people
1959 births
American aerospace engineers
MIT School of Engineering faculty
Massachusetts Institute of Technology alumni